Nicky Saxton (born 2 October 1984) is an English rugby league footballer who has played in the 2000s and 2010s.

Genealogical information
Nicky Saxton was born in Castleford, West Yorkshire, England, he is the brother of the rugby league footballer; Tommy Saxton, and the nephew of the rugby league footballer; Alan Banks.

Career playing statistics

Point scoring summary

Matches played

References

External links
 Nicky Saxton Official Player Profile

1984 births
Living people
Bradford Bulls players
English rugby league players
Rugby league centres
Rugby league fullbacks
Rugby league players from Castleford